Hannelore Glaser ( Franke; born 4 January 1933) is a German former alpine skier who competed in the 1952 Winter Olympics and in the 1956 Winter Olympics.

References

External links 
 Hannelore Glaser-Franke

1933 births
Living people
German female alpine skiers
Olympic alpine skiers of Germany
Olympic alpine skiers of the United Team of Germany
Alpine skiers at the 1952 Winter Olympics
Alpine skiers at the 1956 Winter Olympics
20th-century German women